Roberts Akmens (born 14 February 1996) is a Latvian sprint canoeist. He competed in the men's K-1 200 metres event at the 2020 Summer Olympics.

References

External links

1996 births
Living people
Latvian male canoeists
Olympic canoeists of Latvia
Canoeists at the 2020 Summer Olympics
People from Talsi
ICF Canoe Sprint World Championships medalists in kayak